Rajendra Kumar Badi (born 10 October 1954) is an Indian politician and was a member of the 14th Lok Sabha of India. He represented the Haridwar constituency of Uttarakhand and is a member of the Samajwadi Party (SP) political party

Joined congress on 26 July 2021 in presence of uttrakhand congress president shri Ganesh Godiyal and Devendra Yadav

External links
 Official biographical sketch in Parliament of India website

1954 births
Living people
Uttarakhand politicians
India MPs 2004–2009
People from Haridwar
Samajwadi Party politicians
Lok Sabha members from Uttarakhand
People from Haridwar district